Boonsboro High School (BHS) is a public high school (grades 9 to 12) in Boonsboro, Washington County, Maryland, United States.

Facilities
The present school building was created in 1958 and renovated in 1975 and 2006. The 1975-76 renovation changed the school from a campus of four buildings situated on a hill to one larger building that combined three of the four original buildings, plus the expanded shop building. The school's central feature is a ramp that leads from the varsity gym up to the cafeteria.

In sports, the school rivals Smithsburg High School and Williamsport High School in Washington County.

Academic recognition
Boonsboro High School was named in U.S. News & World Reports annual listing of the Best High Schools in the United States, earning a Silver Award for test scores consistently above state and national averages.

In 2013, Boonsboro was named as one of two high schools by the Maryland State Department of Education as a "Blue Ribbon School."
Additionally, the Boonsboro Warrior Academic Team has dominated the Washington County Academic Tournament since the tournament's inception, undefeated from 2018-2022 and with a total of 13 wins since Coach Tracy Salka took over the team in 2004 until her retirement in 2022.  https://www.heraldmailmedia.com/story/news/local/2020/03/07/boonsboro-high-school-again-finishes-first-in-academic-championship/43681023/
https://www.heraldmailmedia.com/story/news/2019/02/23/boonsboro-high-school-finishes-first-in-academic-team-competitio/44359901/
https://www.heraldmailmedia.com/story/news/2018/03/17/boonsboro-outsmarts-the-field-at-team-competitio/44481075/
https://www.heraldmailmedia.com/story/news/2018/05/25/boonsboro-high-team-headed-to-national-quiz-bowl-competition-in-atlanta/116549454/

Notable alumni
 Laura Burhenn, singer/songwriter, founder of The Mynabirds indie-pop group
 Garrett Stephenson, former MLB player (St. Louis Cardinals)

References

External links
 School homepage
 Washington County Public Schools: Boonsboro High School

Boonsboro, Maryland
Public high schools in Maryland
Public schools in Washington County, Maryland
Educational institutions established in 1958
1958 establishments in Maryland